is a Japanese idol, singer and talent from Tokyo. She was a member and former leader of the Japanese idol group Idoling!!!. She is represented by Box Corporation talent agency. She made her solo debut as a singer on July 13, 2013.

Career 
Two weeks before being scouted for the Idoling!!! audition, she was a normal high school student who was planning on entering a school for cosmetology. In November 2006, she passed the Idoling!!! audition and entered the group as number 3. In March 2009, when the former leader, Sayaka Katō, graduated, she became the next leader of the group. In May 2011, she starred in, and sang the theme song for an independent film Koneko no Kimochi (コネコノキモチ).  The theme song was entitled "Sora no Ki" (空の木).

Her number in Idoling!!! is 3, and her image flower is the Japanese camellia. She belongs to the same talent agency as fellow members Erica Tonooka, Serina Nagano, Yuna Itō and Karen Ishida.

After being in the group for 7.5 years, she graduated from Idoling!!! on February 14, 2014, at Zepp DiverCity in Odaiba, Tokyo to focus on her solo career.

Discography

Singles
 Today is the Day (2013.07.31) Binyl Records
 MUJINA (2014.05.14) Binyl Records
 Baby Love (2014.08.06) Binyl Records

Filmography

Movies 
 Kuchisake Onna 0 Beginning (2008)
 Abashiri Ikka The Movie (2009)
 Re:Play-Girls (2010)
 Koneko no Kimochi (2011)

TV dramas 
 Tetsudo Musume (2008-2009)
 ShakenBabyY! Shakespeare Syndrome (2010) Fuji TV
 Kurohyou 2 Ryu ga Gotoku Asura-hen (2011) MBS

TV shows 
 Idoling!!! (October 2006 – present) Fuji TV
 Aikatsu!! (December 2011 – present) Music Japan TV
 Box TV (September 2010 - July 2011) Enta!371, Pigoo HD

Image video 
 Maipuru (October 26, 2007)
 Fantasy (August 20, 2008)
 Maipuru Mode (February 18, 2009)
 Kaze no Tani no Maipuru (April 7, 2010)

TV commercials 
 Ryu ga Gotoku of the End (2010) Fuji TV CS

Voice dubbing 
 The Final Destination (October 17, 2009) as Nadia Monroy
 Dollhouse (August 4, 2010) as Ivy
 Robot Taekwon V (December 2010)

Live performance 
 Endo Mai Solo Live "Mai" at Billboard Live Tokyo (May 20, 2012)

Internet shows 
 Nishikawa Takanori no Ienomi!! on Nico Nico Douga channel (April 12 - December 20, 2012) with T.M.Revolution

Bibliography

Photobooks 
 Maipuru (October 25, 2007) 
 Mai Birthday (July 30, 2008) 
 Photore Vol.7 Endo Mai (March 30, 2012)

References

External links 
 Mai Endo Official Profile Page - Box Corporation
 Mai Endo on Binyl Records 
  
  
 Idoling!!! Official Website - Fuji TV
 Idoling!!! Official Website - Pony Canyon

Japanese television personalities
1988 births
Living people
Idoling!!! members
Musicians from Tokyo
Avex Group artists